Scantraxx Evolutionz is a Dutch record label and sub label of Scantraxx Records. The label is owned by hardstyle duo D-Block & S-te-Fan, and they use the label to release their own music. Since the release of EVO 010 they switched the format from 12″ to digital releases.

Releases

References

Dutch record labels